The , abbreviated to the LMO, is a type of JMA  and a part of its . JMA set up five LMOs in Hokkaido, three in Okinawa and one in another each prefecture which has neither  nor ; thus Local Meteorological Observatories count 50 in Japan. They are responsible for local weather services and some of them manage local s.

On the one hand, by way of exception, although Maizuru Marine Observatory is in Kyoto Prefecture, it's just for the Sea of Japan basin; Instead, Kyoto Local Meteorological Observatory takes over general weather services within the prefecture. On the other hand, Kobe Marine Observatory administers both marine weather affairs and general weather services in Hyogo Prefecture, and Nagasaki Marine Observatory is the same position as the Kobe's.

Local Meteorological Observatories in Japan 
 - 

 - 

 - 

 - 

 - 

 - 

 - 

 - 

 - 

 - 

 -

References 
The information in this article is based on that in its Japanese equivalent.

Japan Meteorological Agency